Arthur Day may refer to:

 Arthur Day (English cricketer) (1885–1969), English cricketer
 Arthur Day (Australian cricketer) (born 1933), Australian cricketer
 Arthur Day (golfer) (1878–1946), English golfer
 Arthur Louis Day (1869–1960), American geological physicist
 Arthur H. Day (1890–1967), American lawyer and politician from Ohio
 A. Grove Day (1904–1994), author, teacher, and authority on the history of Hawaii

See also 
 Arthur's Day, an annual series of music events worldwide